The Flaw is a 1933 British thriller film directed by Norman Walker and starring Henry Kendall, Eric Maturin and Phyllis Clare. It was made as a quota quickie at Wembley Studios, and was remade in 1955 with the same title.

Cast
 Henry Kendall as John Millway  
 Eric Maturin as James Kelver  
 Phyllis Clare as Laura Kelver  
 Eve Gray as Irene Nelson  
 Douglas Payne as Inspector Barnes  
 Sydney Seaward as Sergeant  
 Vera Gerald as Mrs. Mamby 
 Elsie Irving 
 E.A. Williams

Critical reception
TV Guide called it a "Nicely constructed thriller," and gave it two out of five stars.

References

Bibliography
 Chibnall, Steve. Quota Quickies: The Birth of the British 'B' Film. British Film Institute, 2007.
 Low, Rachael. Filmmaking in 1930s Britain. George Allen & Unwin, 1985.
 Wood, Linda. British Films, 1927-1939. British Film Institute, 1986.

External links
 

1933 films
British thriller films
1930s thriller films
1930s English-language films
Films shot at Wembley Studios
Quota quickies
Films directed by Norman Walker
British black-and-white films
1930s British films